Leonardo Mafra Teixeira (born 25 April 1989), better known as Leonardo Mafra, is a Brazilian mixed martial artist currently competing in the Welterweight division. A professional competitor since 2010, he has fought for the UFC, Final Fight Championship, and Pancrase.

Background
Mafra was born and spent his early childhood in the Brazilian city of Santo André and began training in mixed martial arts as a teenager.

Mixed martial arts career

Early career
Mafra later moved to Balneário Camboriú and made his professional debut in the Welterweight division in early 2011. He compiled a record of 6–0 competing for regional promotions in his native Brazil, before auditioning for The Ultimate Fighter.

The Ultimate Fighter: Brazil
In February 2012, it was announced that Mafra would a cast member on The Ultimate Fighter: Brazil, representing Team Wanderlei at middleweight.

Mafra got into the house with a decision win over Samuel Trindade.  In his quarterfinal fight, Mafra was submitted (guillotine choke) in the second round by the eventual winner, Cezar Ferreira, and was subsequently eliminated from the competition.

Ultimate Fighting Championship 
Mafra made his official debut facing fellow castmate, Thiago Perpétuo on 23 June 2012 at UFC 147.  Mafra lost the fight via TKO in the third round.  Subsequently, Mafra was released from the promotion.

Mafra made a return to the welterweight division and the regional scene in Brazil, where he was able to string a five fight win streak, finishing all of his opponents by way of KO/TKO, before getting a return call to the UFC.

Mafra was tabbed as a short notice replacement as he faced Rick Story on 16 July 2014 at UFC Fight Night 45, filling in for an injured John Howard.  Story defeated Mafra via submission in the second round.

Mafra faced Cain Carrizosa on 21 March 2015 at UFC Fight Night 62.  Mafra won the fight by unanimous decision.

Mafra faced Stevie Ray on 18 July 2015 at UFC Fight Night 72. He lost the fight by TKO in the first round and was subsequently released from the promotion.

Post-UFC career 
After being released by the UFC, Mafra signed with the Croatian promotion Final Fight Championship for an MMA bout against another UFC veteran: Anthony Njokuani. Mafra won the fight via unanimous decision.

Mafra was scheduled to face João Carvalho at Imortal FC 5 on 23 July 2016. However, the bout was cancelled due to an unknown reason.

He then faced Satoru Kitaoka at Pancrase 281 on 2 October 2016. He lost the fight via first-round submission.

Mafra was scheduled to face Mohammad Fakhreddine at Brave 6: Kazakhstan on 28 April 2017 but failed to make weight and the bout was cancelled.

Mafra then returned to his native Brazilian circuit and was scheduled to face Luiz Cado at Imortal FC 7 on 11 November 2017. However, Cado withdrew from the bout and was replaced by Rogério Santos. He won the fight via technical knockout due to leg kicks.

Brave CF
Mafra signed a contract with Brave CF in 2018 and made his promotional debut against Gadzhimusa Gaziev at Brave CF 12 on 11 May 2018. He lost the fight via first-round technical knockout due to an injury.

Mafra made his sophomore appearance in the promotion against Djamil Chan at Brave CF 25 on 30 August 2019. He won the fight via unanimous decision.

He was then scheduled to face Carl Booth at Brave CF 35 on 28 March 2020 but the event was postponed due to the COVID-19 pandemic and the bout was scrapped.

Mafra then challenged Eldar Eldarov for the BRAVE Combat Federation Super Lightweight Championship at Brave CF 46 on 16 January 2021. He lost the fight via doctor stoppage after the first round.

Mixed martial arts record

|-
|
|align=center| 
|Cleiton Silva
|
|Brave CF 60
|
|align=center| 
|align=center| 
|Isa Town, Bahrain
|
|-
|Loss
|align=center| 15–6
| Eldar Eldarov
| TKO (doctor stoppage)
| Brave CF 46
| 
|align=center|1
|align=center|5:00
| Sochi, Russia
|For BCF Super Lightweight (165 lbs) Championship.
|-
|Win
|align=center| 15–5
| Djamil Chan
| Decision (unanimous)
| Brave CF 25
| 
|align=center|3
|align=center|5:00
| Belo Horizonte, Brazil
|Super Lightweight (165 lbs) debut.
|-
|Loss
|align=center| 14–5
| Gadzhimusa Gadzhiev
| TKO (injury)
| Brave CF 12: KHK Legacy
| 
|align=center|1
|align=center|4:58
| Jakarta, Indonesia
|Catchweight (163 lbs) bout.
|-
|Win
|align=center| 14–4
| Rogerio Santos
| TKO (leg kicks)
| Imortal FC 7
| 
|align=center|3
|align=center|2:24
| Paraná, Brazil
|Return to Welterweight.
|-
|Loss
|align=center| 13–4
| Satoru Kitaoka
| Submission (heel hook)
| Pancrase: 281
| 
|align=center|1
|align=center|1:05
| Tokyo, Japan
|
|-
|Win
|align=center| 13–3
| Anthony Njokuani
| Decision (unanimous)
| FFC 25: Mitchell vs. Lopez
| 
|align=center|3
|align=center|5:00
| Springfield, Massachusetts, United States
|
|-
|Loss
|align=center|12–3
|Stevie Ray
|TKO (punches)
|UFC Fight Night: Bisping vs. Leites 
|
|align=center|1
|align=center|2:30
|Glasgow, Scotland
|
|-
|Win
|align=center| 12–2
| Cain Carrizosa
| Decision (unanimous)
| UFC Fight Night: Maia vs. LaFlare
| 
|align=center|3
|align=center|5:00
| Rio de Janeiro, Brazil
|
|-
| Loss
|align=center| 11–2
|Rick Story
| Submission (arm-triangle choke)
|UFC Fight Night: Cowboy vs. Miller
|
|align=center|2
|align=center|2:12
|Atlantic City, New Jersey, United States
|
|-
| Win
|align=center| 10–2
|Antonio Marcos
| KO (knees)
|Power Fight Extreme 11
|
|align=center|1
|align=center|1:36
|Curitiba, Brazil
|
|-
| Win
|align=center| 9–2
|Alexandre Goncalves
| TKO (punches and elbows) 
|NCF 19
|
|align=center|2
|align=center|2:30
|Balneário Camboriú, Brazil
|
|-
| Win
|align=center| 9–1
|Marcos Cacador
| TKO (punches)
|Max Sport: 13.2
|
|align=center|2
|align=center|0:50
|São Paulo, Brazil
|Catchweight (176 lbs) bout.
|-
| Win
|align=center| 8–1
|Samuel Trindade
| TKO (doctor stoppage)
|Iron Fight Combat 3
|
|align=center|2
|align=center|5:00
|Feira de Santana, Brazil
|Won the Iron FC Welterweight Championship.
|-
| Win
|align=center| 7–1
|Deivid Santos
| KO (punch)
|Sparta MMA
|
|align=center|1
|align=center|0:23
|Itajaí, Brazil
|Return to Welterweight.
|-
| Loss
|align=center| 6–1
|Thiago Perpétuo
| TKO (punches)
|UFC 147
|
|align=center|3
|align=center|0:41
|Belo Horizonte, Brazil
|
|-
| Win
|align=center| 6–0
|Douglas Del Rio
| Submission (armbar)
|NCF 9
|
|align=center|1
|align=center|1:55
|Itajaí, Brazil
|
|-
| Win
|align=center| 5–0
|Dimitry Burgo
| TKO (punches)
|K.O. Fight: GZero
|
|align=center|1
|align=center|3:45
|Londrina, Brazil
|
|-
|Win
|align=center| 4–0
|Santiago Ponzinibbio
|TKO (punches)
|Centurion Mixed Martial Arts 2
|
|align=center| 1
|align=center| 3:17
|Itajaí, Brazil
| 
|-
| Win
|align=center| 3–0
|Willian Coelho
| Decision (unanimous)
|Black Trunk Fight 2
|
|align=center|3
|align=center|5:00
|Florianópolis, Brazil
|
|-
| Win
|align=center| 2–0
|Maiquel Bigolin
| Decision (unanimous)
|Floripa Fight 7
|
|align=center|3
|align=center|5:00
|Florianópolis, Brazil
|
|-
| Win
|align=center| 1–0
|Geverson Pereira
| TKO (punches)
|NCF 6
|
|align=center|1
|align=center|3:53
|Brusque, Brazil
|
|-

See also
 List of male mixed martial artists
 List of current Brave CF fighters

References

External links
 Leonardo Mafra at Brave CF
 
 

Brazilian male mixed martial artists
Welterweight mixed martial artists
Mixed martial artists utilizing Muay Thai
Mixed martial artists utilizing Brazilian jiu-jitsu
Living people
1989 births
People from Santo André, São Paulo
Ultimate Fighting Championship male fighters
Brazilian Muay Thai practitioners
Brazilian practitioners of Brazilian jiu-jitsu
Sportspeople from São Paulo (state)